Graham John Clifton Bond (28 October 1937 – 8 May 1974) was an English rock/blues musician and vocalist, considered a founding father of the English rhythm and blues boom of the 1960s.

Bond was an innovator, described as "an important, under-appreciated figure of early British R&B", along with Cyril Davies and Alexis Korner. Jack Bruce, John McLaughlin and Ginger Baker first achieved prominence in his group, the Graham Bond Organisation. Bond was voted Britain's New Jazz Star in 1961. He was an early user of the Hammond organ/Leslie speaker combination in British rhythm and blues – he "split" the Hammond for portability – and was the first rock artist to record using a Mellotron. As such he was a major influence upon later rock keyboardists: Deep Purple's Jon Lord said "He taught me, hands on, most of what I know about the Hammond organ".

Biography
Bond was born in Romford, Essex. Adopted from a Dr Barnardo's home, he was educated at the Royal Liberty School in Gidea Park, East London, where he learned music. His first jazz gig was in 1960 with the Goudie Charles Quintet, staying for a year. He first gained national attention as a jazz saxophonist as a member of the Don Rendell Quintet, then briefly joined Alexis Korner's Blues Incorporated before forming the Graham Bond Quartet with musicians he met in the Korner group, Ginger Baker on drums and Jack Bruce on double bass, together with John McLaughlin on guitar; and adopting the Hammond organ as his main instrument. The group then became The Graham Bond Organisation (GBO), while John McLaughlin was later replaced by Dick Heckstall-Smith on saxophones. Their album There's A Bond Between Us of October 1965 is considered the first recording of rock music that uses a Mellotron.

The group was plagued by substance abuse problems, particularly Bond's, as well as the relentless bickering between Baker and Bruce, culminating in Bond firing Bruce. Baker would leave soon after to form Cream with Bruce and Eric Clapton. The band carried on as a trio with Jon Hiseman on drums, but Bond's mental and physical health continued to deteriorate, until the band eventually dissolved in 1967. The group's lack of commercial success is generally put down to Bond being "unable to find a commercially successful niche. Some jazz fans regarded Bond's band as too noisy and rock-based, while the pop audience found his music complicated and too jazzy". Heckstall-Smith and Hiseman went on to form Colosseum, recording Bond's song "Walkin' in the Park" for their first album. According to John Steel, in that same period over the 1960s, Bond gave the rock band The Animals their name before they hit fame after seeing them perform at the  a’Gogo in Newcastle.

After the break-up of the Organisation, Bond continued to exhibit mental disorders, with manic episodes and periods of intense depression, exacerbated by heavy drug use. Moving to America, he recorded two albums and performed session work for Harvey Mandel and Dr. John among others, but he returned to England in 1969. He then formed Graham Bond Initiation with his new wife Diane Stewart, who shared his interest in magick, and in 1970 Holy Magick, which recorded a self-titled album and We Put Our Magick on You. He was also re-united with old band members while playing saxophone in Ginger Baker's Air Force and spending a short time in the Jack Bruce Band. Solid Bond, a double-album compiling live tracks recorded in 1963 by the Graham Bond Quartet (Bond, McLaughlin, Bruce and Baker) and a studio session from 1966 by the Graham Bond Organisation (Bond, Heckstall-Smith and Hiseman) was released that same year.

In 1972 he teamed up with Pete Brown to record Two Heads are Better Than One. He also recorded an album with the John Dummer Band in 1973, although this was not released until 2008. After the near-simultaneous collapse of his band and his marriage, Bond then formed Magus with British folk-singer Carolanne Pegg and bassist Pete Macbeth, which disbanded around Christmas 1973 without recording. During that same period, he discovered American singer-songwriter-guitarist Mick Lee, and they played together live but never recorded. Plans to include Chris Wood of Traffic never materialized due to Bond's death.

Bond's financial affairs were in chaos, and the years of lack of commercial success and the recent demise of Magus had badly hurt his pride. Throughout his career he had been hampered by severe bouts of drug addiction, and spent January 1973 in hospital after a nervous breakdown. According to Harry Shapiro, in his biography The Mighty Shadow, Bond was considered as a possible replacement for Patrick Moraz in Refugee. On 8 May 1974, Bond died under the wheels of a Piccadilly line train at Finsbury Park station, London, at the age of 36. Most sources list the death as a suicide. Friends agree that he was off drugs, although becoming increasingly obsessed with the occult (he believed he was Aleister Crowley's son).

In 2015 his work was the focus of a two-hour special on the Dr Boogie radio show.

Discography

With The Graham Bond Organisation
 The Sound of '65 (1965)
 There's a Bond Between Us (1965)
 Live at Klooks Kleek (1988, recorded 1964)

Other
 Roarin''' (with Don Rendell New Jazz Quartet, Jazzland, October 1961)
 Love Is the Law (Pulsar, 1969)
 Mighty Grahame Bond (Pulsar, 1969)
 Solid Bond (Warner Bros., 1970)
 Holy Magick (Vertigo, December 1970)
 We Put Our Magick on You (Vertigo, October 1971)
 Bond in America (Philips (UK-only compilation), 1971)
 Two Heads Are Better Than One (with Pete Brown, 1972)

Bibliography
 Bob Brunning (1986), Blues: The British Connection, London: Helter Skelter, 2002, 
 Bob Brunning, The Fleetwood Mac Story: Rumours and Lies Omnibus Press, 2004, foreword of B.B.King
 Dick Heckstall-Smith (2004), The Safest Place in the World: A personal history of British Rhythm and blues, Clear Books,   – First Edition: Blowing The Blues – Fifty Years Playing The British Blues Christopher Hjort, Strange brew: Eric Clapton and the British blues boom, 1965-1970, foreword by John Mayall, Jawbone (2007), 
 Harry Shapiro, Alexis Korner: The Biography, Bloomsbury Publishing PLC, London 1997, Discography by Mark Troster
 Harry Shapiro, Graham Bond: The Mighty Shadow, Square One (UK), 1992
 Martyn Hanson: "Playing the Band – the musical life of Jon Hiseman". Temple Music, 2010. 

References

Further reading
Richie Unterberger, Unknown Legends of Rock 'n' Roll: Psychedelic Unknowns, Mad Geniuses, Punk Pioneers, Lo-fi Mavericks and More''. Miller Freeman Press, 1998.

External links
Graham Bond Org
Graham Bond Organisation Discography

1937 births
1974 deaths
1974 suicides
20th-century British male singers
20th-century English singers
20th-century saxophonists
Blues Incorporated members
Blues rock musicians
British blues (genre) musicians
British male saxophonists
British rhythm and blues boom musicians
English blues musicians
English jazz saxophonists
English male singers
English rock keyboardists
English rock saxophonists
Ginger Baker's Air Force members
John Dummer Band members
People educated at the Royal Liberty Grammar School
People from Romford
People with bipolar disorder
The Graham Bond Organisation members
Suicides by train
Suicides in Islington